Marcin Płacheta (born 23 March 1979) is a Polish bobsledder. He competed in the four man event at the 2006 Winter Olympics.

References

External links
 

1979 births
Living people
Polish male bobsledders
Olympic bobsledders of Poland
Bobsledders at the 2006 Winter Olympics
People from Skierniewice